Pennsylvania University may refer to one of two unrelated universities:

 University of Pennsylvania, a private university
 Pennsylvania State University, a state-related university

See also
Gettysburg College, originally named Pennsylvania College